2003 in the Philippines details events of note that happened in the Philippines in the year 2003.

Incumbents

 President – Gloria Macapagal Arroyo (Lakas-CMD)
 Vice President – Teofisto Guingona (Lakas-CMD)
 Senate President – Franklin Drilon
 House Speaker – Jose de Venecia
 Chief Justice – Hilario Davide, Jr.
 Philippine Congress – 12th Congress of the Philippines

Events

January 
 January 22–26 – 4th World Meeting of Families is held at the Quirino Grandstand, Luneta Park, Manila.

February 
 February 13 – The Overseas Absentee Voting Act is passed into law providing a system of voting for overseas Filipinos.

March 
 March 1 - As a result of the implementation of Electric Power Industry Reform Act (EPIRA) law or Republic Act 9136 one year and nine months earlier on June 8, 2001, National Power Corporation (NAPOCOR/NPC) took over the operations, maintenance, management, and ownership of the Philippine power grid and its related assets and facilities to another government-owned corporation National Transmission Corporation (TransCo) which officially started TransCo to own, operate, maintain, and manage the grid.
 March 4 – A bomb explodes at an airport in Davao City that killed at least 19 people.

May 
 May 26 – The Anti-Trafficking in Persons Act of 2003 is passed into law. The Philippines becomes one of the first Asian nations to pass anti-trafficking legislation.

July 
 July 27 – A group of soldiers calling themselves the Bagong Katipuneros launches a mutiny in Oakwood against then President Gloria Macapagal Arroyo citing alleged corruption of Arroyo's administration and claimed that Arroyo was about to declare martial law.

Holidays

On November 13, 2002, Republic Act No. 9177 declares Eidul Fitr as a regular holiday. The EDSA Revolution Anniversary was proclaimed since 2002 as a special non-working holiday.  Note that in the list, holidays in bold are "regular holidays" and those in italics are "nationwide special days".

 January 1 – New Year's Day
 February 25 – EDSA Revolution Anniversary
 April 9 – Araw ng Kagitingan (Bataan and Corregidor Day)
 April 17 – Maundy Thursday
 April 18 – Good Friday
 May 1 – Labor Day
 June 12 – Independence Day 
 August 31 – National Heroes Day
 November 1 –  All Saints Day
 November 25 – Eidul Fitr
 November 30 – Bonifacio Day
 December 25 – Christmas Day
 December 30 – Rizal Day
 December 31 – Last Day of the Year

In addition, several other places observe local holidays, such as the foundation of their town. These are also "special days."

Concerts
 September 13 – The Event with F4 and Barbie Hsu live at the PhilSports Complex, Pasig
 November 16 – Mariah Carey live at the Bonifacio Global City Open Field, Taguig
 December 26 – F4 live at the Bonifacio Global City Open Field, Taguig

Television

Sports
 July 13 – The Talk 'N Text Phone Pals wins their first-ever PBA title in 13 years, winning four straight over the defending champions Coca Cola Tigers in a 4–2 series victory.
 August 23 – Alaska Aces wins their PBA Invitational Championship title with a 2–1 series victory over the Coca-Cola Tigers.
 December 14 – After two runner-up finishes in the first two conferences, the Coca Cola Tigers won their 2nd PBA title with a 4–3 series victory over San Miguel Beermen.
 December 5–13 – The Philippines participated at the 22nd Southeast Asian Games were held in Hanoi, Vietnam.

Births
 February 14 – Zephanie Dimaranan, singer
 March 6:
 Jehramie Trangia, singer
 Shanelle Agustin, actress
 March 12 – Andrea Brillantes, actress, model, commercial endorser
 March 25 – Yen Quirante, actress
 June 1 – Jayda, actress and singer
 June 20 – Kyle Echarri, actor and singer
 August 16 – Harvey Bautista, actor
 September 13 – Ashley Del Mundo, actress
 October 12 – Kobie Brown, actor
 October 13 – Ar Angel Aviles, actress
 October 22 – Lie Reposposa, singer, actress and housemate
 November 22 – Reign Parani, actress
 December 27 – Louise Abuel, actor, commercial model

Deaths
 January 8 – Patricia Borromeo, ramp model (b. 1971)
 March 23 – Amado Cortez, former actor and diplomat (b. 1928)
 March 31 – Eddie Arenas, Filipino actor (b. 1935)
 April 9 – Rod Navarro, former TV host, actor, and radio commentator (b. 1936)
 June 2 – Danny Holmsen, former film director (b. 1930)
 June 19 – Rafael Ileto, former Defense secretary (b. 1920)
 June 24 – Rene Cayetano, former Senator and father of Senator Pia and Alan Peter Cayetano (b. 1934)
 July 2 – Antonio Fortich, Catholic bishop and social activist (b. 1913)
 July 4 – Manuel Araneta, Jr., Filipino basketball player (b. 1926)
 July 6 – Jose C. Abriol, Filipino Catholic priest, monsignor, and Bible translator from the Philippines (b. 1918)
 July 18 – César Ramírez, former actor and father of the late Ace Vergel (b. 1929) 
 July 19:
 Oscar Moreno, former actor and father of Boots Anson-Roa (b. 1921) 
 Vic Vargas, former actor (b. 1939)
 July 27 – Emmanuel Pelaez, former Vice-President of the Philippines (b. 1915)
 September 10 – Tata Esteban, 48, former film director (b. 1954) 
 September 26 – Inday Badiday, Filipino host and journalist who was known as Philippine television's "queen of showbiz talk shows" and "queen of intrigues" (b. 1944)
 October 7 – Julie Fe Navarro, radio talent and showbiz writer (b. 1941)
 November 14 – Carding Castro, former singer-comedian and singing comic duo Reycard Duet (b. 1935)
 November 16 – Catalino Macaraig, Jr., Filipino politician (b. 1927)
 November 17 – Betty Chua-Sy, former finance executive for the Coca-Cola Export Corp. (b. 1972)
 November 20 – Pedro Yap, former Chief Justice (b. 1918)
 December 5 – Fred Montilla, former actor (b. 1919)
 December 14 – Blas Ople, former Senator and former Secretary of Department of Foreign Affairs (b. 1927)
 December 29 – Miko Sotto, former young actor and son of actress and radio host Ali Sotto (b. 1982)

References

 
2003 in Southeast Asia
Philippines
2000s in the Philippines
Years of the 21st century in the Philippines